Katherine is a feminine given name.

Katherine, Catherine or Katharine may also refer to:

People

Saints
 Saint Catherine of Alexandria (4th century)
 Saint Catherine of Sweden (circa 1332–1381)
 Saint Catherine of Siena (1347-1380)
 Saint Catherine of Bologna (1413-1463)
 Saint Catherine of Genoa (circa 1447-1510)
 Saint Catherine of Ricci (1522-1590)

Royalty
 Catherine of Portugal (nun) (1436–1463), Portuguese infanta (princess)
 Catherine the Great (1729–1796), Empress of Russia
 Catherine of Valois (1401–1437), Queen consort of England to Henry V of England
 Catherine of Aragon (1485–1536), Queen Consort of England as Henry VIII of England's first wife
 Catherine Howard (c. 1523–1542), Queen Consort of England as Henry VIII of England's fifth wife
 Catherine Parr (1512–1548), Queen Consort of England as Henry VIII of England's sixth wife
 Catherine de' Medici (1519–1589), Queen of France as the wife of King Henri II of France
 Catherine of Braganza (1638–1705), Queen Consort of King Charles II of England
 Catherine I of Russia (1684–1727), Tsarina-consort of Russia, wife of Peter the Great
 Katharine, Duchess of Kent (born 1933), wife of Prince Edward, Duke of Kent
 Princess Katherine of Greece and Denmark (1913–2007), great-granddaughter of Queen Victoria of the United Kingdom
 Katherine, Crown Princess of Yugoslavia (born 1943), wife of Alexander, Crown Prince of Serbia
 Catherine, Princess of Wales (born 1982), wife of the Prince of Wales, heir to the British throne
 Catherine of Lancaster (1373–1418), daughter of John of Gaunt and wife of Henry III of Castile

Places

Australia
 Katherine, Northern Territory, a town in Australia

Canada
 St. Catharines, Ontario, Canada

Egypt
 Saint Catherine's Monastery, Mount Sinai, Egypt

England
 Catherine-de-Barnes, Solihull, England. Perhaps named after Ketelberne, who owned it after the Norman Conquest.

Greece
 Katerini, Greece, named for Saint Catherine of Alexandria

Russia
 Yekaterinburg, Russia, named for St. Catherine and Empress Catherine II of Russia

Scotland
 Catrine, Ayrshire, Scotland

United States
 Catherine, Alabama
 Katherine, Arizona
 Catherine, Colorado
 Catharine, New York
 Catharine Creek, Oregon
 Lake Catherine (disambiguation)

Literature
 Katherine (Min novel), a 1995 novel by Anchee Min
 Katherine (Seton novel), a 1954 historical novel by Anya Seton
 Catherine (Thackeray novel), an 1840 serial novel by William Makepeace Thackeray
 Catherine (Waltari novel), a 1942 novel by Mika Waltari
 Catherine (Benzoni novel), 1964 novel by Juliette Benzoni

Music
 Catherine (alternative rock band), an alternative rock band signed to TVT Records
 Catherine (metalcore band), a metalcore band from Sacramento, California
"Katharine", a The Durutti Column song from the album The Return of the Durutti Column (1980)
 "Catherine" (song), the Luxembourgish entry in the Eurovision Song Contest 1969, performed in French by French singer Romuald

Movies and television
 Katherine (film), 1975 television film starring Sissy Spacek, Art Carney, and Henry Winkler
 Catherine (1986 TV series), a French TV series produced for Antenne 2 channel in 1986
 Catherine (1999 TV series), a Quebec sitcom that aired on Radio-Canada from 1999 to 2003
 Catherine the Great (TV series), a 2015 Russian television series
 Ekaterina (TV series), a 2014 Russian television series

Ships
 , various ships of the British Royal Navy
 , a United States Navy patrol boat in commission from 1917 to 1918
 , a United States Navy patrol boat and tug in commission from 1917 to 1919
 Catherine (ship), several ships of that name

Other uses
 Catherine (video game), 2011 video game

See also
 
 
 
 Catriona
 Karen (name)
 Katerine (disambiguation)
 Kitty (given name)
 Kathryn (disambiguation)
 Catherina
 Ekaterina (disambiguation)